Coupatezia is a prehistoric genus of ray in the family Dasyatidae whose fossils are found in strata dating from the Maastrichtian stage until the last species' extinction during the Middle Eocene.  These rays were found shallow seas in Europe, Africa and the eastern United States.

Classification

Species
Coupatezia fallax
Coupatezia trempina (Maastrichtian "Kemp Clay" stratum of Texas)
Coupatezia turneri
Coupatezia woutersi (Lutetian Virginia)

See also
 Flora and fauna of the Maastrichtian stage
 List of prehistoric cartilaginous fish (Chondrichthyes)

References

External links
Elasmo.com "The Life and Times of Long Dead Sharks" 

Myliobatiformes
Cretaceous cartilaginous fish
Paleocene fish
Eocene fish
Lutetian genus extinctions
Maastrichtian genus first appearances
Prehistoric fish of North America
Prehistoric fish of Africa
Prehistoric cartilaginous fish genera